Trachyrhamphus bicoarctatus, also known as the double-ended pipefish is a species of marine fish belonging to the family Syngnathidae. They can be found in reefs, seagrass beds, and sandy habitats throughout the Indo-Pacific from East Africa to New Caledonia and from Japan to Australia. Males of this species are considered mature when they reach approximately 26 centimeters long, but adults can grow to be lengths of 40 centimeters. Reproduction occurs through ovoviviparity in which males brood eggs before giving live birth.

References

External links 

 Trachyrhamphus bicoarctatus at FishBase
 Trachyrhamphus bicoarctatus at Fishes of Australia
 

Syngnathidae
Fish described in 1857
Taxa named by Pieter Bleeker